Acmispon micranthus is a species of legume native to California and northwestern Mexico. It is known by the common name San Diego bird's-foot trefoil. It is found in the coastal mountain ranges of California and Baja California, where it grows in various types of scrub and canyon habitat. It is an annual herb taking a spreading or upright form. It is lined with leaves each made up of oval leaflets each about a centimeter long. The inflorescence is a small bunch of red and yellow flowers. Each flower is in a tubular calyx of sepals and is only a few millimeters long. The fruit is a narrow, bent legume pod up to 1.5 centimeters long, including the hooked beak at the tip.

References

Jepson Manual Treatment
USDA Plants Profile

External links
Photo gallery

micranthus
Flora of California
Flora of Northwestern Mexico
Flora without expected TNC conservation status